The 2013 San Antonio Scorpions FC season was the club's second season of existence, where they played in the North American Soccer League, the second division of the American soccer pyramid. Including the San Antonio Thunder soccer franchise of the original NASL, this was the 4th season of professional soccer in San Antonio. The Scorpions were the reigning North American Supporters' Trophy winners and began play at Toyota Field in San Antonio, Texas.

Competitions

Preseason

NASL Spring Championship 

The spring season consists of 12 games beginning on April 6 and ending on July 4.  The schedule features a round robin format with each team playing every other team home and away. The winner of the spring season will automatically qualify for, and host, the 2013 Soccer Bowl.

Standings

Results

Results by round

Matches
Kickoff times are in CDT (UTC-05) unless shown otherwise

Mid-season friendlies

NASL Fall Championship 

The fall season consists of 14 games beginning on August 3 and ending on November 2. The schedule features a round robin format with each team playing every other team home and away. The fall season also introduces the New York Cosmos into the league. The winner of the fall season will automatically qualify for the 2013 Soccer Bowl.

Standings

Results

Results by round

Matches
Kickoff times are in CDT (UTC-05) unless shown otherwise

U.S. Open Cup

References 

San Antonio Scorpions seasons
San Antonio Scorpions
San Antonio Scorpions
San Antonio Scorpions FC season